St. Francis Square Mall is a five-storey shopping mall located in the heart of Ortigas Center and part of the St. Francis Square Complex. The mall is a direct competitor of the nearby SM Megamall. It was home to over 1,000 stalls and stores and housed the Christ's Commission Fellowship (CCF) megachurch until 2013 when the megachurch moved to the CCF Center in Tiendesitas, Pasig.

The mall has since undergone major renovations, and as of 2019 houses mainly office spaces.

Mall levels 
Tenants of the mall are the Puregold Jr. Supermarket on the basement floor, the St. Francis Generic Drug Store and St. Francis Bookstore on the ground floor, and the St. Francis Department Store at the mezzanine floor of the mall. The mall attracts a daily foot traffic of 50,000 people, and is known for its tiangge stalls that mainly sell phone cases, gadget repair services, DVDs, and children's toys.

Upper levels 
The third, fourth, and fifth floors of the mall comprise CCF's main facilities. A part of the third floor acts as a transit floor for escalators from the second floor to the fifth floor as a direct access corridor to and from the CCF auditorium.

CCF St. Francis 
Part of the second floor and most of the third floor of the building comprise classrooms for CCF's Sunday school ministry, NxtGen. To limit outside access to the Sunday school, the only entrance to the Sunday school is located at the second floor of the mall. The third floor is directly connected to the main auditorium that span the fourth and fifth floors.

The fifth and sixth floors house the 3,000 capacity CCF Auditorium, as well as other support facilities, such as a clinic, and overflow room.

References

External links 
 St. Francis Square - Official website
 BSA Twin Towers - Official website

Ortigas Center
Shopping malls in Mandaluyong
Shopping malls established in 2005

tl:Kambal na Toreng BSA sa St. Francis Square